Windy City is a 1984 American drama film written and directed by Armyan Bernstein and starring Kate Capshaw, Josh Mostel and John Shea.

Plot
Danny Morgan, a writer living in Chicago, feels his world crashing down around him. His former girlfriend, Emily, is about to get married. His close childhood friend, Sol, has leukemia. Danny reflects on his past relationship with Emily while also trying to give Sol the send-off he deserves.

Danny pitches the idea of a sailing trip to their group of friends. This plan refers back to their childhood fantasies of being adventurers and pirates. However, Danny's friends have obligations and claim they are unable to just take off.

Despite a clandestine kiss with Emily at a dance club, Danny is unable to persuade her to take him back. On the day of Emily's wedding, he runs to stop her but is blocked by a rising drawbridge. He tries to jump the gap between the bridge's two halves, but falls short and lands in the river below. He arrives too late to stop the wedding ceremony.

Danny and Sol's friends throw caution to the wind and pitch in to make the sailing trip happen. As they all sail away from the harbor, Sol thanks Danny. In voice over, Danny reveals Sol died on the evening of trip's ninth day.

Years later, Danny runs into Emily, who is now divorced. The two of them go to a park, talk and hint at a possible reconciliation.

Cast
 John Shea as Danny Morgan
 Kate Capshaw as Emily Reubens
 Josh Mostel as Sol
 Jim Borrelli as Mickey
 Jeffrey DeMunn as Bobby
 Eric Pierpoint as Pete
 Lewis J. Stadlen as Marty
 James Sutorius as Eddy
 Niles McMaster as Michael
Lisa Taylor as Sherry
 Nathan Davis as Mr. Jones
 Louie Lanciloti as Ernesto
 Wilbert Bradley as Joe the Janitor

References

External links

1984 films
1980s English-language films
Films set in Chicago
1984 drama films
American drama films
Films scored by Jack Nitzsche
Films directed by Armyan Bernstein
Films with screenplays by Armyan Bernstein
CBS Theatrical Films films
1984 directorial debut films
1980s American films